Ramjerd-e Yek Rural District is a rural district (dehestan) in the Central District of Marvdasht County, Fars Province, Iran. At the 2006 census, its population was 10,138, in 2,254 families.  The rural district has 22 villages.

References 

Rural Districts of Fars Province
Marvdasht County